Cerynea tetramelanosticta is a species of moth of the family Erebidae first described by Emilio Berio in 1954. It is found in Tanzania (on Zanzibar) and in Mauritius.

References 

 Berio (1954). "Etude de quelques Noctuidae Erastriinae de Madagascar (Lepid. Noctuidae)". Mémoires de l'Institut scientifique de Madagascar. (E) 5:133–153; pls. 6, 7.

Moths described in 1954
Boletobiinae
Moths of Mauritius
Moths of Africa